Elbląg Upland Landscape Park (Park Krajobrazowy Wysoczyzny Elbląskiej) is a protected area (Landscape Park) in northern Poland, established in 1985, covering an area of .

The Park lies within Warmian-Masurian Voivodeship: in Braniewo County (Gmina Frombork) and Elbląg County (Gmina Elbląg, Gmina Milejewo, Gmina Tolkmicko).

Within the Landscape Park are five nature reserves.

Despite its location at the opposite end of Poland, it has the features of a mountain area, as evidenced by the vegetation - mountain rib, ostrich plume and gold-headed lily. The fauna is represented by red deer, dormouse, raccoon dog, white-tailed eagle, honey buzzard, crane, lesser spotted eagle and other more common species. The highest point is the Srebrna Mountain (198.5 m above sea level), there are numerous streams. When visiting the park, it is also worth going to the baroque palace in Kadyny.

References 

Landscape parks in Poland
Parks in Warmian-Masurian Voivodeship